The Daycroft School was a co-educational private boarding school founded in 1928. Initially located at a private home in Darien, Connecticut, it relocated to Stamford in 1935, and in 1963, to the neighboring town of Greenwich, Connecticut. Relocating again in Greenwich, it eventually occupied the Rosemary Hall campus from 1971 until Daycroft's closing in 1991. Smart founded the school for the children of local Christian Scientists.

School history 
Daycroft was founded by Sarah Pyle Smart as a private school for the children of area Christian Scientists so they could be educated in an environment akin to their home life, where the teachings of Christian Science were "an integral part" of life. To that end, the faculty were all members of The Mother Church. Admission to the school was restricted to the children of parents who were students of Christian Science. The school had no official tie with the Christian Science Church. In later years, admission was extended to those had a close relative who was a member of The Mother Church or one of its branch churches.

The school was a member of the Secondary Education Board and offered pre-school through high school, in general subjects and college preparatory education. The school offered partial scholarships and was incorporated in 1939 as a non-profit institution. Daycroft served both day students and boarding students at its Greenwich campus. It contained a boys and girls dormitory. Dorm parents were selected to live on each floor of the dorms annually both to live there as a resource for the students and to help maintain safety for the students.

The school's initial home was in Darien, Connecticut, where the Smarts lived. In 1935, a portion of an estate was purchased on Noroton Hill, near the Stamford Cove and became the new home for the school. The 46-acre Stamford campus was sold to Clairol in 1963, when the school moved to the Rock Ridge area of Greenwich, Connecticut. In 1971, the school moved to the former Rosemary Hall campus, also in Rock Ridge. In 1998, the campus was placed on the National Register of Historic Places because of its architectural significance. Its chapel was designed in the Middle English Gothic style by Theodore E. Blake of Carrère & Hastings.

In 1972, the Daycroft school was one of the last sites of a polio outbreak in the United States. Due to their Christian Science belief, very few students at the school were immunized for polio. The outbreak prompted an emergency quarantine and mass immunization, which successfully prevented polio from spreading to the rest of the state. Ultimately, at least 11 school children (9 boys and 2 girls) were stricken by the paralytic form of the disease.

Notable alumni and staff 
Richard Bergenheim
Jacqueline Moss
Zack Snyder

References

External links
Daycroft School Foundation
CS e-News Spotlight

Schools in Fairfield County, Connecticut
Greenwich, Connecticut
Christian Science in Connecticut
Former Christian Science churches, societies and buildings in the United States
Educational institutions established in 1928
1928 establishments in Connecticut